"Calypso Crazy" is a single by British singer Billy Ocean. It is the second single from the singer's seventh studio album, Tear Down These Walls (1988). Following the successful chart performances of the Tear Down These Walls single "Get Outta My Dreams, Get into My Car", "Calypso Crazy" was released as the album's second single. It became his twelfth and final UK Top 40 hit to date.

The single was not released in the US, where "The Colour of Love" was released instead, peaking at #17. This would later be the album's third single in the UK, reaching #65.

Track listing
 12" single (BOS T 2)
"Calypso Crazy (Extended Version)"
"Calypso Crazy (7" Version)"
"Calypso Crazy (Instrumental Version)"
"Let's Get Back Together"

 7" single (BOS 2)
"Calypso Crazy" - 4:26
"Let's Get Back Together" - 4:42

Chart performance

References

External links

1988 songs
Billy Ocean songs
Songs written by Robert John "Mutt" Lange
Song recordings produced by Robert John "Mutt" Lange
Songs written by Billy Ocean